Wylam Railway Bridge (officially West Wylam Bridge, also known as Hagg Bank Bridge and locally as Points Bridge and Half-Moon Bridge) is a footbridge and former railway bridge crossing the River Tyne at Hagg Bank, approximately  west of Wylam in Northumberland, England.

History 
The bridge was originally built for the Scotswood, Newburn and Wylam Railway, to connect the North Wylam Loop with the Newcastle and Carlisle Railway.

A number of bodies were involved in the bridge's construction: W G Laws engineered the bridge, W E Jackson & Co. of Newcastle upon Tyne built the bridge's foundations and masonry, while Hawks, Crawshay and Sons of Gateshead manufactured the ironwork. The bridge cost £16,000 to build and was opened to rail traffic on 6 October 1876.

Railway services over the bridge ended in 1968 when the line was closed as part of the Beeching cuts. The trackwork was removed in 1972 and subsequently, in 1975, the bridge was converted into a footbridge and cyclepath linking Wylam with the Tyne Riverside Country Park at Low Prudhoe.

A model of the bridge can be seen at the nearby Wylam Railway Museum.

Design 
The bridge's design came about because there was a need to avoid having piers in the river bed, because their construction would have disrupted shallow mine workings underneath. This single span is constructed of three ribs each connected with diagonal braces to prevent cross strain and distortion caused by the wind.
Another notable design consideration is the height of the track above water-level. This led to the destruction of most of the bridges along the River Tyne, including those at Hexham and the old Tyne Bridge at Newcastle.

It has been suggested that Wylam Railway Bridge might have been an inspiration for the designers of the much later Tyne Bridge in Newcastle upon Tyne and the Sydney Harbour Bridge in Australia. However, there are some major differences in design between this bridge and those at Newcastle and Sydney. Perhaps the greatest difference is the load taken by the abutments of the bridge. In the cases of the Tyne and Sydney Harbour bridges the abutments or "pylons" bear no load from the single span arch and are aesthetic. The arch of this bridge, however, is anchored into the abutments and as such directly bears the lateral load of the arch. This prevents distortion and a possible "road-wave" forming in front of a traversing train or vehicle.

Wylam Railway Bridge is claimed to be one of the earliest rib arch bridges in the world and as such is grade II* listed citing the bridge as "...said to be the earliest use of this form of construction to carry railway".

Renovation 
In 1997 the bridge was re-painted at a cost of £224,000 with the support of £157,000 from the Heritage Lottery Fund. This work included removing the old lead-based paint and repainting with lead free alternatives in the bridges original colour scheme.

References 

Bridges completed in 1876
Railway bridges in Northumberland
Crossings of the River Tyne
Pedestrian bridges in England
Through arch bridges in the United Kingdom
Former railway bridges in the United Kingdom
Railway Bridge
Grade II* listed railway bridges and viaducts